The starry night toad (Atelopus arsyecue) is a species of toad in the family Bufonidae endemic to the Sierra Nevada de Santa Marta, Colombia. Reproduction takes place in fast-flowing rivers. It is named after its unique coloration, being largely black with white spots.

It is threatened by chytridiomycosis and habitat loss and was feared extinct for over 30 years. However, its continued existence was known to the Arhuaco community in Sogrome, who referred to the animal as gouna and considered its habitat a sacred location. In 2019, the tribe consented to collaboration with researchers and showed them the living population, marking the first sighting of this species by researchers in over 30 years.

References

Atelopus
Amphibians of Colombia
Endemic fauna of Colombia
Páramo fauna
Amphibians described in 1994
Taxonomy articles created by Polbot